One of Our Own may refer to:

 One of Our Own (1975 film), a television film starring George Peppard
 One of Our Own (2007 film), an independent drama directed by Abe Levy
 "One of Our Own" (CSI: Miami), a 2006 episode of the TV series CSI: Miami